Aedes simplex is a species complex of zoophilic mosquito belonging to the genus Aedes. It is endemic to Sri Lanka

References

simplex
Insects described in 1907